The 2014 Foxtel Cup was the fourth and final season of the Australian rules football knock-out competition involving clubs from the various state league competitions from around Australia.

The Cup's purpose is to support and promote the second-tier Australian rules football competitions and to provide another way of developing lower-tier Australian Football League (AFL) players.

The format of the competition was as follows:
 Nine teams competed.
 With the exception of the pre-qualifying round, matches were played on Tuesday nights as stand alone games and be broadcast by Fox Footy.
 The champions received $100,000 in prize money, and the runners-up received $40,000.

The top two sides from Western Australia (East Perth and West Perth) joined Norwood and reigning Foxtel Cup champion West Adelaide from South Australia, Box Hill Hawks and Williamstown from Victoria, and Tasmanian representative Western Storm, as participants in the 2014 Foxtel Cup. North East Australian Football League qualifiers, Aspley and Belconnen, competed against each other in Round 1 of the 2014 NEAFL competition as a pre-qualifying round, with Aspley winning through to play Williamstown in round 1 of the Foxtel Cup.

The selection of Western Storm, a club which was competing in the Tasmanian Football League for the first time in 2014, as Tasmania's representative was controversial, but came as a result of the defending Tasmanian Football League premiers, South Launceston, leaving the league. The majority of South Launceston's senior list shifted to Western Storm, so AFL Tasmania decided that the new club was a sufficiently close representation of the defending premiers to allow it to compete in the Foxtel Cup, rather than substituting the 2013 runners-up Burnie.

The competition began in March 2014 and concluded with Williamstown winning their second Foxtel Cup championship by defeating West Perth in the Grand Final at Simonds Stadium on 22 July 2014. The Coles medal for best on ground in the Grand Final was awarded to Williamstown's Ben Davies. The coach of Williamstown was Andrew Collins, former 200+ game triple premiership player with Hawthorn, who had coached West Adelaide to the Foxtel Cup championship the year previous.

2014 season

Participating clubs

 NEAFL Eastern Conference (1)
 Belconnen
 NEAFL Northern Conference (1)
 Aspley
 SANFL (2)
 Norwood
 West Adelaide

 TFL (1)
 Western Storm
 VFL (2)
 Box Hill 
 Williamstown
 WAFL (2)
 East Perth
 West Perth

Club details

Stadiums

Fixture
The AFL released the fixture on 29 November 2013.
2014 Foxtel Cup Fixture

Bracket

Qualifying round

Round 1

Semi-finals

Grand Final

References

External links
 Official Foxtel Cup website
 Official AFL Canberra website
 AFL Northern Territory
 AFL Queensland State Site
 North East Australian Football League - official website
 South Australian National Football League – official website
 Tasmanian Football League Website
 Victorian Football League – official website
 Western Australian Football League – official website

F
Foxtel Cup